Marcello Pantone (born 6 April 1965) is an Italian male retired sprinter, who participated at the 1987 World Championships in Athletics.

Achievements

References

External links
 

1965 births
Living people
Italian male sprinters
World Athletics Championships athletes for Italy
Mediterranean Games gold medalists for Italy
Athletes (track and field) at the 1987 Mediterranean Games
Mediterranean Games medalists in athletics
Universiade medalists in athletics (track and field)
Universiade bronze medalists for Italy
Italian Athletics Championships winners
Medalists at the 1991 Summer Universiade